Lake Chautauqua is a reservoir in the U.S. state of Mississippi.

The lake's name is a transfer from Chautauqua Lake, in New York.

References

Chautauqua
Bodies of water of Tippah County, Mississippi
Mississippi placenames of Native American origin